Go, known as baduk (바둑) in Korea, for the 2013 Asian Indoor and Martial Arts Games, was held at the Yonsei Global University Campus. It took place from 30 June to 5 July 2013. It was also this event's debut at these Games. Before that Go was part of the 2010 Asian Games at Guangzhou.

Medalists

Medal table

Results

Men's individual

Swiss round
30 June – 1 July

Knockout round
2 July

Men's team

Swiss round
3–4 July

 After the 4th round, two teams tied as the 4th place in the team score and individual scores. Therefore, the fourth place was determined by an extra match between them. The winning team Chinese Taipei was advanced to the second phase as the 4th place.

Knockout round
5 July

Women's team

Swiss round
3–4 July

Knockout round
5 July

Mixed pair

Swiss round
30 June – 1 July

Knockout round
2 July

References

External links
 

2013
2013 Asian Indoor and Martial Arts Games events
Asian Games